Ravindra Kishore Sinha, also known as RK Sinha (22 September 1951) is an Indian billionaire businessman, politician and journalist. He is the founder of Security and Intelligence Services, a private security provider in India and Australia.

Sinha is a graduate of Political Science and Law and started his career as a journalist. He created Security and Intelligence Services to help retired servicemen after the Indo-Pakistani War of 1971.

Sinha was elected to the Rajya Sabha to represent Bihar State by the Bhartiya Janata Party (BJP) as a Member of Parliament in the Indian Upper House in 2014.

In November 2017, an investigation conducted by the International Consortium of Investigative Journalism cited his name in the list of politicians named in "Paradise Papers" allegations.  This reference did not appear to contain anything other than legal dealings.

References

1951 births
People from Buxar district
Businesspeople from Bihar
Rajya Sabha members from Bihar
Living people
Bharatiya Janata Party politicians from Bihar
People named in the Paradise Papers